Nur Aisyah Binte Aziz (Jawi: نور عايشه بنت عزيز; born 21 May 1994) better known by her stage name Aisyah Aziz is a Malay Singaporean singer-songwriter and actress.  

She came in sixth place on the tenth season of the Malaysian singing reality show, Akademi Fantasia. She is the younger sister of Singaporean actor and singer, Aliff Aziz.

Early life 
Aisyah Aziz was born in Singapore on 21 May 1994, into a Malay family of mixed Arab ancestry. She has an older brother, Aliff, an actor and singer based in Malaysia, and a twin sister, Nur Ain.

She attended Zhenghua Secondary School with her older brother, she filmed an episode of Zaman Sekolah 2 at the school.

Aisyah grew up with listening to Malay songs, and has cited P. Ramlee, Saloma and Anita Sarawak as influences. Among Western artists she cites Amy Winehouse, Aerosmith, Ella Fitzgerald, Celine Dion, Christina Aguilera and Mariah Carey as artists who have influenced her and helped shape her sound.

Career 
Aisyah started taking part in singing competitions at age 11. At 19, Aisyah participated in the popular singing reality show Akademi Fantasia season 10 in 2013, reaching the finals and finishing in sixth. Her debut single, "Mimpi", produced by Faizal Tahir and Omar K. was first performed on the Akademi Fantasia finals.

In 2017, Aisyah was nominated for nine awards at Anugerah Planet Muzik, she became the first Singaporean to win Best APM song at Anugerah Planet Muzik, for the song "Senyum Saja". She won two other awards on the night, Best Song (Singapore) for "Senyum Saja" and Best Collaboration (Song) for "Tanda Tanya".

Aisyah left her Malaysian record label, Rocketfuel Entertainment in 2019, becoming an independent artist based in Singapore.

She released her first English single, "Sugar" on 10 January 2020. Her debut EP of the same name, Sugar (The Live Extended Play), was initially released as a video on YouTube, in February, before being released on streaming platforms. The EP marked her first foray into songwriting, she wrote the EP with her songwriting partner, Harun Amirrul Rasyid Mohame.

In June 2022, Aisyah made her theatre acting debut in Bangsawan Gemala Malam at the Victoria Theatre.

Personal life 
In 2017, Aisyah was diagnosed with muscle tension dysphonia, which prevented her from singing for a year.

Discography

Studio albums

Extended plays

Singles

As lead artist

Collaborations

As featured artist

Soundtrack appearances

Guest appearances

Filmography

Television

Music videos

Web series

Theatre

Awards and nominations

References

External links 

Living people
1994 births
Akademi Fantasia participants
Singaporean people of Malay descent
Singaporean people of Arab descent
Singaporean pop singers
Rhythm and blues singers
21st-century Singaporean women singers
21st-century Singaporean actresses